Bayside Shopping Centre is a super regional shopping centre in the suburb of Frankston on the Mornington Peninsula of Melbourne.

Transport 
The Frankston railway line offers frequent train services to Frankston station located five minutes away from Bayside Shopping Centre.

Bayside Shopping Centre has bus connections to Mornington East, Portsea, Pearcedale, Carrum and surrounding suburbs. It is served by Transdev with bus stops on Nepean Highway and Dandenong Valley Highway.

Bayside Shopping Centre also has a multi level carpark with 3,452 spaces.

History 
Frankston Town Centre, originally consisted of three shopping centres: Bayside, Balmoral and Quayside.

The original Bayside Shopping Centre, located between Beach Street and Ross Smith Avenue, opened on 3 October 1972 with a Myer department store, a McEwans hardware store, a Ritchies supermarket and 52 speciality stores. It was owned by the National Mutual Life Association of Australasia (now a part of AMP).

Balmoral Arcade opened in 1973 and was located at the southern end of Station Street, between Shannon Street (now a pedestrian mall) and Key Street which opened with 19 speciality stores.

Quayside Shopping Centre opened in 1991 near both Bayside and Balmoral, on the carpark between Ross Smith Avenue and Station Street, with a Target department store, a Coles supermarket and 72 speciality stores. Bayside and Quayside were also linked by an enclosed bridge over Ross Smith Avenue. Balmoral Arcade and Quayside Shopping Centre were later merged with the Bayside Shopping Centre in which it subsequently renamed to Bayside Shopping Centre.

Bayside and Balmoral were acquired by John Gandel, the owner of Quayside, during the late-1990s, and upgrades were carried out by manager CFS Retail Property Trust (later Novion Property Group). A portion of Ross Smith Avenue was permanently closed to create a new food court (underneath the existing bridge link).

In 2004 the centre underwent a $63 million redevelopment which included a new 3 level building on the northern side of Beach Street linked by a multi-level pedestrian bridge on the former multi storey carpark opposite Myer. Kmart, Safeway (now Woolworths) and a further 55 stores were added as part of this development. This development was completed in March 2006. An entertainment precinct, on Wells Street (separated from the centre itself but still part of the Bayside complex) was added and features a 12 screen Australian Multiplex Cinemas complex (now Hoyts), Strike Bowling Bar and 10 restaurants/food outlets.

Another upgrade in 2011 brought the combined total cost of development to AU$200 million since 1999, with reconfigured tenancies including an entire level dedicated to fashion stores, a refurbished second level food court and an Aldi supermarket.

After 50 years at the centre, the three-storey Myer store will close its doors on 15 January 2023.

Tenants
Bayside Shopping Centre has 88,843m² of floor space, comprising 241 stores over three levels serviced by 3,452 car spaces. The major retailers, which are located at either end of the centre, include Myer, Target, Kmart, Woolworths, Coles, Aldi, TK Maxx, Rebel Sport, King Dory, JB Hi-Fi, Strike Bowling Bar and Hoyts Cinema.

Incidents 
 On 30 March 2016, a blackout caused a gang of up to 20 youths to fight. This outage occurred over 30 minutes, stores were placed into lockdown and a minute after the blackout started, the brawl begun. The blackout was caused after a fire at a United Energy substation near Frankston Train Station earlier in the morning. 
 On 21 December 2017, a gas cylinder exploded at the Bob Jane T-Marts workshop just outside the centre shortly after 7 pm. Witnesses reported hearing multiple 'bangs' and visible flames. The explosion occurred only two hours after a four-wheel drive was driven into pedestrians at Flinders Street in the CBD.

References 

Shopping centres in Melbourne
Shopping malls established in 1972
1972 establishments in Australia
Frankston, Victoria
Buildings and structures in the City of Frankston